Church of the Resurrection is a historic Episcopal church located at 302 High Ridge Road in Little Switzerland, Mitchell County, North Carolina.  The church was built in 1912 as a memorial to Fr. DuBose, an Episcopal priest.  In the 1930s the church was moved from its original location 100 yards uphill, closer to the Blue Ridge Parkway.  The church is not open year-round, but only from May through October with a summer vicar in residence.

It was added to the National Register of Historic Places in 1999.

References

Episcopal church buildings in North Carolina
Churches on the National Register of Historic Places in North Carolina
Churches completed in 1912
Buildings and structures in Mitchell County, North Carolina
National Register of Historic Places in Mitchell County, North Carolina
1912 establishments in North Carolina